The Atlanta Committee for the Games of the XXVI Olympiad, or ACOG, also known as the Atlanta Committee, was an informal name for the Atlanta Committee for the Games of the XXVI Olympiad and the Games of the X Paralympiad. The President of ACOG was Billy Payne.

References
1996 Summer Olympics
Organising Committees for the Olympic Games
Summer Olympics
Sports in Atlanta